Xingong may refer to:

 Xin Gong station (新宫), Beijing Subway, China
 Xingong Subdistrict (新工), in Xinglongtai District, Panjin, Liaoning Province, China